Lazzaro is both a masculine Italian given name and a surname. Notable people with the name include:

Given name
Lazzaro Baldi ( – 1703), Italian Baroque painter
Lazzaro Bastiani (1429–1512), Italian Renaissance painter
Lazzaro Calamech, 16th-century Italian painter and sculptor
Lazzaro Calvi (1512–1587), Italian Renaissance painter
Lazzaro Cattaneo (1560–1640), Italian Jesuit missionary
Lazzaro Donati (1926–1977), Italian painter
Lazzaro Mongiardini, Italian mathematician
Lazzaro Morelli (1619–1690), Italian Baroque sculptor
Lazzaro Pasini (1861–1949), Italian painter
Lazzaro Spallanzani (1729–1799), Italian Roman Catholic priest, biologist and physiologist
Lazzaro Vasari (1399–1468), Italian painter

Surname
Anthony Lazzaro (disambiguation), multiple people
Carol Lazzaro-Weis (1949–2022), American professor of Italian and French
Eva Lazzaro (born 1995), Australian actress
Leandro Lázzaro (born 1974), Argentine footballer
Marc Lazzaro (born 1955), French swimmer
Urbano Lazzaro (1924–2006), Italian resistance fighter
Sofia Lazzaro (born 1934) early stage name of Sofia Loren from 1950-1953

See also
 3602 Lazzaro, a main-belt asteroid
 Happy as Lazzaro, a 2018 Italian film

Italian masculine given names